Manardi is an Italian surname. Notable people with the surname include:

 Raffaele Manardi (1913–?), Italian bobsledder
 Giovanni Manardo or Manardi (1462–1536), Italian physician, botanist, and humanist

Italian-language surnames
Surnames of Italian origin